The Prytanée national militaire is a French military school managed by the French military, offering regular secondary education as well as special preparatory classes, equivalent in level to the first years of university, for students who wish to enter French military academies. The school is located in western France in the city of La Flèche.

At first founded in 1604 by the king Henri IV, the school was given to the Jesuits in the aim to "instruct the young people and make it fall in love with sciences, honour and virtue, in order to be able to serve". It then became the "Prytanée" wanted by Napoleon in 1800.

History

From the Château-Neuf to the creation of the royal college
Françoise d'Alençon, who had become a widow in 1537, decided to retire in her land of La Flèche, which she had received as a gift from her husband Charles de Bourbon. The old feodal castle, actually Château des Carmes, was too old and with no comfort, Françoise d'Alençon ordered the construction of a new building. The "Château-Neuf" (New Castle) was erected between 1539 and 1541 outside of the city, in the place of the Prytanée Militaire and following the plans of the architect Jean Delespine. Some recent new elements give a better idea of the original castle and garden.

In 1550, after her death, her son Antoine of Navarre inherits of her possessions. With his wife Jeanne d'Albret, inheritor of the Kingdom of Navarre, he stays in La Flèche multiple times, as in February 1552 and then in May 1553, a few months before their son's birth, the future king Henri IV.

On 3 December 1603, by letters patent sent from Rouen, Henri IV authorised the return of the Jesuits, who had been banned by the parliament of Paris in 1594 after the failed attack against the King made by one of their latter pupils, Jean Châtel. The King allows them to live in the places where they were before their departure and in other cities. Henri IV recommends them to particularly stay in his house of La Flèche in order to establish their college.

The first Jesuits priests arrive to La Flèche in the beginning of November 1603, led by Pierre Barny, named rector of the college. In January 1604, the college welcomes its first students. From its first year, the college knows a success and counts around 1 000 pupils. Their number grows fast in the following years.

The Jesuit College (1604–1762)

The first Jesuits left Pont-à-Mousson on 16 October 1603, and reached La Flèche on 2 January 1604. They started to teach grammar, rhetorics, Latin, Greek, Hebrew, philosophy, mathematics, and theology. A foundation edict was issued at Fontainebleau in May 1607, in which the building started to take its present shape.

René Descartes was one of the first and most illustrious students of the school from 1607 to 1615, and introduced the school in his Discourse on Method under the phrase "I was studying in one of the most celebrated schools in Europe".

The College continued to expand, and, upon the death of Henry IV, a vast church was built, in which the hearts of Henry IV and his wife queen Marie de Medicis were enshrined.

Missions to China and the Americas

Many of the Jesuit missionaries who went to the China during the 17th century had been trained at the College. Among them were Énemond Massé, who became an early missionary to Canada and became Minister of the College upon his return in 1614. When he went back to Canada, he was accompanied by Charles Lalemant, another alumnus of the school. Paul Le Jeune, also a student of the College, is considered as the "father of the Jesuit missions in New France", and was the Superior of the Jesuits in Quebec from 1632 to 1639. Others were Erard Bille, Jacques Buteux, Nicolas Adam, Barthélemy Vimont, Paul Ragueneau, Claude de Quentin, Isaac Jogues.

In China also, numerous students of the College became active participants in the missions. Three of the five Jesuits sent by Louis XIV to China were from the Collège: Jean de Fontaney, the Superior of the mission, who had been a professor of mathematics there and became rector of the school until 1710 after his return from China; Joachim Bouvet, who was a philosophy student in 1676, became a teacher to the Kangxi Emperor; Claude Visdelou, who was a repetitor and a teacher at the school from 1676 to 1678. Others included Guillaume le Couteux, Pierre Foureau, Charles de Broissia, Emeric de Chavagnac, Jean-François Fouquet, and Joseph Labbe.

Around 1650, the College became a centre of cosmopolitan learning, as "Americans, Indians, Tartars, Russians, and even Chinese visited it". In 1751, two Chinese students were enrolled: Yang Dewang (Etienne Yang Tche-teh), and Gao Ren (Louis Kao Fen).

Cadets school (1764–1776)
In 1764 following the expulsion of the Jesuits, after a lapse of two years, the school was transformed by Louis XV and Choiseul into a military institution designed to train young cadets for admission to the École Militaire, the "École de cadets ou École militaire préparatoire à l’École militaire du Champ de Mars". These efforts at creating military institutions followed military defeats in the Seven Years' War (1756–1763). The school was reserved to 250 students of noble extraction, as well as sons of officers who were wounded or died in combat, and the sons of the Chevaliers de Saint-Louis.

College (1776–1793)
In 1776 the Count of St Germain attempted to close the school, but it was re-established by Louis XVI, who gave its management to the "Fathers of the Christian Doctrine" (Pères de la Doctrine chrétienne). Among others, they educated the future General Bertrand, who accompanied Napoléon to Saint Helena, and the two Chappe brothers, who invented the aerial telegraph.

The College was closed in 1793 following the advent of the French revolution. For a while, the buildings were used for a variety of purposes, such as becoming a cordonery for the Army of the Republic.

Prytanée militaire (1808–present)
On 24 March 1808, Napoléon renamed the school "Prytanée militaire", in a classic reference to the Greek prytaneis (literally "Presidents"), an executive body acting as the religious and political heart of ancient Greek cities. As Napoleon had moved to Fontainebleau to establish his court, he had decided to transfer the "École spéciale Militaire de Fontainebleau" to Paris, and the "Prytanée de Saint-Cyr" to La Flèche. Since then various names were adopted for the school, such as "École royale militaire" (1814–1830), Collège royal militaire (1831–1848), Collège national militaire (1848–1853), Prytanée impérial militaire (1853–1870), Prytanée militaire and Prytanée national militaire (since 1870).

During World War II in 1940, the Prytanée had to be moved for a few years successively to Billom, Valence, then Briançon.

Today

Today the Prytanée provides secondary education and also has "Classes préparatoires", that is, preparatory classes to the entrance examinations of the French elite Grandes Écoles, such as École polytechnique, the Navy École navale, the Army École spéciale militaire de Saint-Cyr, the École de l'Air and various civilian engineering or commercial graduate schools.

The school's students are nicknamed "Brutions", as a classic reference to the inhabitants of the Bruttium region of Roman Italy, who had a reputation for their roughness and fighting spirit.

Insignas
The school grades received by students are even today symbolized by military insignias which are worn on the traditional uniform (Uniforme de tradition), starting with "Sergent-Major" (4 golden chevrons) for the top of a class, "Sergent" (3 golden chevrons), "Caporal-Chef" (2 red and 1 golden chevrons), and finally "Caporal" (2 red chevrons). Typically, the top ten students of each class during a given quarter would receive such insignias.

Students also have colored shoulder badges for each year, attached to the daily fatigues ("Uniforme de travail"), starting with blue for the first year of high school, orange for the second, and green for the third. These badges can further be adorned with various small symbols and decorations, especially expressing the type of career to which each student is aspires.

Famous alumni

The Prytanée has trained various military and non-military celebrities. In chronological order:

Marin Mersenne (1588–1648), theologian, mathematician
Pierre Séguier, statesman and Chancellor of France (1588–1672)
René Descartes, philosopher (1596–1650)
Comte de Guébriant (1602–1643), Marshal of France
La Rochefoucauld (1613–1680), writer
François de Laval (1623–1708), first Bishop of New France
Jean Picard (1629–1682), astronomer
Joseph Sauveur (1653–1716), mathematician and physicist 
James Fitz-James (1670–1734), Duke of Berwick and Marshal of France
du Petit Thouars (1760–1798), Navy officer, hero of the Battle of Aboukir Bay
Claude Chappe (1763–1805), inventor of the optical telegraph
Bertrand (1773–1844), General, follower of Napoleon at Saint Helena
Auguste Davezac (1780–1851), United States Ambassador to the Netherlands
Pélissier (1794–1864), Marshal of France
René François Regnier (1794–1881), ecclesiastical writer
Achille Baraguey d'Hilliers (1795–1878), Marshal of France
Antoine Brutus Menier (1795–1853), entrepreneur and founder of Chocolat Menier
Antoine François Prévost (1797–1863), novelist
Alessandro Barnabò (1801–1874), Catholic Cardinal
Louis d'Aurelle de Paladines(1804–1877), General
Courtot de Cissey (1810–1882), General
Charles-Denis Bourbaki (1816–1897), General
Adrien Joseph Deutsch (1818–1895)
Louis Rossel (1844–1871), Minister of War in the Paris Commune
Gallieni (1849–1916), Marshal of France
Amédée-François Lamy (1858–1900), French officer, conqueror of Chad
Georges Catroux (1877–1969), French general
Gabriel Voisin (1880–1973), aeronautical pioneer
Émile Mireaux (1885–1969), economist, Minister of Education
Prince Husain Bey (1893-1964/9), Crown Prince of Tunisia
Jacques Massu (1908–2002), General
Pierre Guillaumat (1909–1991), entrepreneur and statesman (Minister of the Army, Education)
Kléber Haedens (1913–1973), writer
François Missoffe (1919–2003), statesman
Jean-Claude Brialy (1933–2007), actor
Michel Virlogeux (1946–), architect of Millau Viaduct, the tallest vehicular bridge in the world
Patrick Baudry (1946–), astronaut
Antoine Compagnon (1950–), writer
Jean-François Clervoy (1958–), astronaut
Caroline Aigle (1974–2007), first French female fighter pilot
 Rodolphe Belmer (1969–), Canal+ program director general

Famous professors
Pierre Laromiguière (1756–1837)
Léon Fleuriot (1923–1987)

See also
 List of Jesuit sites

Notes
 On vit arriver au Collège "des Américains, des Indiens, des Tartares, des Russes et même des Chinois", Marchant de Burbure (1803)

References

Li, Shenwen, 2001, Stratégies missionnaires des Jésuites Français en Nouvelle-France et en Chine au XVIIieme siècle, Les Presses de l'Université Laval, L'Harmattan,

External links

History and alumni of the Prytanée
 Cofat site 
"Prytanée historique" by Jacques Maillard

Lycées in Pays de la Loire
Buildings and structures in Sarthe
Educational institutions established in the 1600s
1604 establishments in France
Boarding schools in France
Education in Pays de la Loire
Military high schools